Leslie Roe "Bubba" Floyd (June 23, 1917 – December 15, 2000) was a Major League Baseball shortstop who played in three games for the Detroit Tigers in 1944.

Floyd was one of many ballplayers who only appeared in the major leagues during World War II. From June 16 to June 18 he was in the starting lineup for three games against the St. Louis Browns at Briggs Stadium. He hit very well, going 4-for-9 (.444) with a double and a run scored. He drew one walk to give him an even .500 on-base percentage. In the field he handled nine chances without an error.

He died in his hometown of Dallas, Texas at the age of 83.

External links
Baseball Reference
Retrosheet

1917 births
2000 deaths
Baseball players from Dallas
Buffalo Bisons (minor league) players
Dallas Rebels players
Davenport Blue Sox players
Detroit Tigers players
Greenville Majors players
Kilgore Braves players
Major League Baseball shortstops
Oklahoma City Indians players
Pensacola Pilots players
Portland Beavers players
Tyler Trojans players